Chezib, also known as Achziv of Judah, is a biblical place-name associated with the birth of Judah's son, Shelah (Genesis 38:5), corresponding to the Achziv of the Book of Joshua (15:44), a town located in the low-lying hills of the plain of Judah, known as the Shefela. In I Chronicles 4:22, the town is rendered as Chozeba. The place is now a ruin.

Identification
Historical geographers are divided as to the location of Chezib in Judea. While some identify the site as Khirbet a-Sheikh Ghazi, others say that it is to be recognised in the nearby site of Khirbet ʿĒn el-Kizbe (grid position 149/122 PAL). In both cases, the old namesake is preserved in the name of a nearby spring ʻAin el-Kezbeh (ʿĒn el-Kizbe), a place in the Elah Valley near Moshav Aviezer, directly south of Bayt Nattif. According to IAA archaeologists, Zissu and Gass, the location of Khirbet ʿĒn el-Kizbe near the ancient road and the water source by the same name "strongly support identifying this site with ancient Achzib/Chezib/Chozeba," both, on account of the preservation of the ancient name at the water source, and that at its site was found pottery from Iron Age II and the Persian period (including two Royal lmlk jar handles). According to Zissu, the ancient site stretches over an area of approximately eight dunams (nearly 2 acres).

Formerly, the site had tentatively been identified with Tell el-Beide, a site now known as Tel Lavnin, while others placed its location at one of the unidentified ruins near Khirbet Qila and Khirbet Beit Nesib. Archaeologist Boaz Zissu rejects the notion that the site Chezib of Judah could have been Tel Lavnin, saying that "since Khirbet Tell el-Bēḍā / Tel Lavnīn was clearly occupied during the Byzantine Period, it is questionable whether this site is the same as Eusebius’ ruined Chasbi," since Eusebius puts Chezib as a "deserted place" in his days. Like many of the ruins of ancient cities in Israel, the site near Kh. a-Sheikh Ghazi has no very well-defined characteristics, but appears to be spread over a considerable area.

For this reason, some have proposed that Achzib of Judah be sought for somewhere between Keilah and Mareshah.

Etymology

The name Chezib, etymologically, is derived from the word "disappointment," "delusion," "failing" or "lying." In the Aramaic Targum of Pseudo-Yonathan ben Uzziel on Gen. 38:5, as well as in Genesis Rabba (§85), Chezib is rendered as Paskath, said to be the Aramaic equivalent of Chezib ("failing"). Others say that its name is allegedly derived from Shelah's son, Cozeba, who is mentioned in I Chronicles (4:22).

History
The Lachish Letters makes mention of a certain "Beit Achzi[b]" in the Shefelah, the lower stratum of the Judean range, believed to be the Chezib of Judah. Eusebius, in his Onomasticon, notes of the place that "there the sons of Judah were born; now a desolate place, shown in the territory of Eleutheropolis near Adullam."

In classical Hebrew literature, the town is mentioned as being confederate with Pekah the son of Remaliah, the king of the northern tribes of Israel, for which it incurs the divine wrath of the prophet Micah, who uses a play on words to denounce the towns of Maresha, Achzib, and Adullam. Israelite potters are said to have occupied the site during the preëxilic, late First Temple period. "Sh[eikh] Ghazy" and "ʾAin el Kezbeh" are both shown in the 1880 map published by Conder & Kitchener's Survey of Western Palestine. Today, the sites have mostly been planted over with pine trees by the Jewish National Fund (Keren Kayemet).

Site's distinguishing features
The site at Khirbet a-Sheikh Ghazi is strewn with the remains of razed buildings, and thick walls that are partially standing and which were constructed of fieldstones. Within the environs of the site is a burial chamber built in the face of a cliff, containing six kokîm (niches) and which, according to C.R. Conder, signifies a Jewish burial place, dating back to a period before the nation became subject to the Western powers of Greece and Rome. The site has revealed archaeological relics dating back to the Iron Age, until as late as the Byzantine period.

Gallery

References

Bibliography

 (volume 2, 1938)

 (Appendix - Notes on the Architecture in Palestine)

 (Hebrew)

 (Leipzig 1907)

External links

Survey of Western Palestine, 1880 Map, Map 17: IAA, Wikimedia commons
 

Ancient villages in Israel
Former populated places in Israel
Land of Israel
Canaanite cities
Biblical geography
Hebrew Bible cities
Kingdom of Judah
Ancient Jewish history
Valley of Elah